Brian Hubble (born 1978 in Newport News, Virginia) is an American artist. He received a BFA from Virginia Commonwealth University in 2001 and attended The Illustration Academy the following summer. In 2011, he received his MFA at The School of the Art Institute of Chicago. He lives and works in Brooklyn.

Hubble has created photo-collage illustrations for publications such as The New York Times, Harper's Magazine, M.I.T. Technology Review and Psychology Today. In 2004, he made illustrations for The Stranger, author of Under the Tuscan Sun Francis Mayes for Atlanta Magazine, and legendary rock band Guided By Voices for Cincinnati Citybeat. Additional clients of his include Atlantic Monthly, Yale, The Deal, Johns Hopkins, Bulletin of the Atomic Scientists, Duke University, The American Prospect, Notre Dame, Progresa (Spain), VMEN (Greece), and Foreign Policy (France).

His illustrations have most recently been included in Taschen's Illustration Now! Vol. 3  and Print.

Hubble has also curated and exhibited throughout the U.S. including Darke Gallery in Houston, Texas, Ghostprint Gallery in Richmond, Virginia, and Rabbithole Gallery in Brooklyn, New York.

References

Illustration Now! Vol 3.
Gapers Block Blog
The Commonwealth Times

External links
 Brian Hubble Website
 Interview with Brian Hubble
myartspace interview
The Ispot
Creative Boom
Saatchi Gallery site

American illustrators
20th-century American painters
American male painters
21st-century American painters
21st-century American male artists
1978 births
Living people
Virginia Commonwealth University alumni
Alumni of Edge Hill University
People from Newport News, Virginia
20th-century American male artists